The Palace Revolt of 1912 (Thai: กบฏ ร.ศ. 130) was a failed uprising against the absolute monarchy of Siam. Discontent in the army during the reign of King Vajiravudh (or King Rama VI) led to the unsuccessful coup.

Background

In 1909, a group of soldiers got into an argument over a woman with a group of Vajiravudh's pages near the entrance to Vajiravudh's palace. At the time, Vajiravudh was the crown prince and designated successor to King Chulalongkorn (King Rama V). Six soldiers were arrested, and Vajiravudh petitioned Chulalongkorn to cane the soldiers. The practice of caning had recently been banned, and Chulalongkorn refused the petition. However, Vajiravudh threatened to resign as successor, and Chulalongkorn eventually consented to the caning. The incident caused much dissatisfaction within the army.

Crown Prince Maha Vajiravudh succeeded his father as King of Siam on 23 October 1910. Vajiravudh set out in his coronation speech to modernize and westernize Siam in his role as its absolute monarch.

The new king spent lavishly on his coronation and lived a life of excess in a period when most of the kingdom's populace were rural farmers and feudal serfs. Infatuated with Western culture and practices and considering himself an Edwardian English gentleman, Vajiravudh spent his time translating Shakespeare into Thai, staging dramatic productions, hunting, and overseeing his Wild Tiger Corps.

Wild Tiger Corps

On 1 May 1911, Vajiravudh established the Wild Tiger Corps (Thai: กองเสือป่า) (RTGS: Kong Suea Pa). The corps was meant to be a nationwide paramilitary corps, answerable only to the monarch. At first a ceremonial guard, it became a military force of 4,000 within its first year. Filled with commoners, the king would often mess with them and socialize with them openly. Army officers were not permitted to join the organization. The corps eventually rivaled the army in strength and the civil service in influence. The king even went so far as appointing some to high ranks in the army and nobility.

While the king socialized with members of the corps, the regular army and aristocrats were deeply dissatisfied. They saw these new appointments as a threat to their hold on power. Partially due to massive spending on new palaces and dramatic productions, the kingdom was deeply in debt and was in danger of financial collapse.

The revolt that never happened
On 13 January 1912, dissatisfied with his reign and with the absolutist regime (especially his favourism towards the Wild Tiger Corps), a group of seven army officers decided to overthrow the king. The group's membership eventually reached 91 officers. The group were led by army Captain Khun Thuayhanpitak (Thai: ร.อ.ขุนทวยหาญพิทักษ์) and included some members of the king's own bodyguard. Perhaps inspired by the successful overthrow of the Manchus and the Qing Dynasty in China that same year, they decided to move forward. Their plans were unclear and their goals were contradictory. Some wanted to replace Vajiravudh with one of his many brothers, others wanted a constitutional monarchy and some in the extreme wing, a republic.

On 1 April 1912, Thai New Year, the king was to preside over a merit making ceremony in public. Captain Yut Khongyu (Thai: ร.อ.ยุทธ คงอยู่) was selected (by lottery) by the plotters to assassinate the monarch on that day. Filled with guilt he instead confessed all the plans and names of the conspirators to the commander of the king's bodyguard on 27 February, who, in turn, told the king's brother, Prince Chakrabongse Bhuvanath, The Prince of Bishnulok. The plotters were quickly arrested and imprisoned. At a military tribunal three were sentenced to death, 20 received life imprisonment, 32 received twenty years, six received fifteen years and a further 30 received 12 years imprisonment. They were tried for attempted regicide, treason, and attempted overthrow of the government.

The failed uprising was the first revolt against the House of Chakri from the outside the nobility. Despite their actions, most of the plotters were pardoned or had their sentences lessened by the king himself in 1924. This included the death sentences (the king felt that no one had been hurt). However the lesson was not lost on Vajiravudh, who quickly stepped up vigilance against any such threats in the future.

Aftermath and legacy
The Wild Tiger Corps was disbanded soon after the revolt. In 1914, Vajiravudh determined that the act providing for invoking martial law, first promulgated by his father in 1907, was not consistent with modern laws of war or convenient for the preservation of the external or internal security of the state, so he changed it to the modern form that, with minor amendments, continues to be in force. Vajiravudh reigned until 1925, initiating many reforms with mixed success. Vajiravudh died of natural causes and was succeeded by his brother Prajadhipok (Rama VII). Prajadhipok inherited from Vajiravudh a massive fiscal deficit, made worse by the onset of the Great Depression. The absolute monarchy was eventually overthrown by the Revolution of 1932, the leaders of which openly confessed their inspiration to be the actions of the 1912 plotters.

See also
Vajiravudh
Prajadhipok
Chakri Dynasty
Siamese Revolution of 1932
History of Thailand (1768–1932)

References

Further reading 
 Greene, Stephen Lyon Wakeman. (1999). Absolute Dreams. Thai Government Under Rama VI, 1910-1925. Bangkok: White Lotus.
 Stowe, Judith A. (1991). Siam Becomes Thailand: A Story of Intrigue. C. Hurst & Co. Publishers.
 Baker, Christopher John, and Phongpaichit, Pasuk. (2005). A History of Thailand. Cambridge University Press.

Attempted coups in Thailand
1912 in Siam
Rama VI period
Political history of Thailand
Conflicts in 1912
1910s coups d'état and coup attempts